Watford Locks is a group of seven locks on the Leicester Line of the Grand Union Canal, in Northamptonshire, England, famous for the Watford Gap service area.

The locks are formed (looking from the south), of two single locks, a staircase of four, and a final single lock. Together they lift the canal  to the "Leicester Summit", which it maintains all the way to Foxton Locks. The four staircase locks are equipped with working
side ponds which are used to save water.

The locks were built to carry narrowboats, and the system was opened in 1814. In the early 20th century there were plans to build an inclined plane similar to that at Foxton as part of a scheme to allow the passage of barges, but the plan was abandoned when the inclined plane at Foxton proved uneconomic.

When the Grand Union Canal was formed in 1929, there were further proposals to widen the flight as part of the modernisation going on elsewhere on the Grand Union's network, but these plans did not develop further.

The locks are hemmed in by the Roman Watling Street (now the A5 road), the M1 motorway, and the West Coast Main Line railway, which all fit through the narrow Watford Gap, between two hill systems.

The locks are usually supervised during the cruising season from Easter to October, with the locks padlocked outside permitted hours. This is done to prevent problems arising from misuse and to ensure that queues are kept to the minimum. Boaters operate the locks themselves under the lock keeper's supervision. On arrival at the top or bottom boaters should report to the lock keeper to register their arrival before attempting to operate the flight. At busy times there can often be a delay of two hours or more but transit of the flight takes approximately 45 minutes; it is made quicker by the fact that the locks are narrow beam and the gates are light.

Access
Access  from the A5 Watling Street is difficult and not suitable for wheelchairs or prams.

Going northbound, parking can be found on a hard standing outside a large caravan sales-shop situated on public land, between two turnings that are signposted as going to Watford.  Upon arriving, the locks can be found by walking across a frontage following signposts for the Jurassic Way footpath.  The locks can be reached by crossing over a stile.

Notes

References

See also

Bingley Five Rise Locks in West Yorkshire
Bingley Three Rise Locks in West Yorkshire
Foxton Locks near Market Harborough, Leicestershire
Caen Hill Locks near Devizes, Wiltshire
Fourteen Locks near Newport, South Wales
Tardebigge Locks near Bromsgrove, Worcestershire

Transport in Northamptonshire
Buildings and structures in Northamptonshire
Lock flights of England
Staircase locks of England